Kim Jin-woo (born July 17, 1983) is a South Korean actor and singer. He began his acting career in musical theatre, and has since starred in television series such as Queen and I (2012), The Birth of a Family (2012), Can't Stand Anymore (2013) and The Return of Hwang Geum-bok (2015).

Personal life 
In September 2018 it was announced that the actor would wed his girlfriend at a venue in Seoul. The bride is three years younger than him and works as a flight attendant. They met through the introduction of an acquaintance and have been seeing each other since the previous spring. He also previously announced their engagement in July.

Filmography

Television series

Film

TV Movies

Musical theatre

Discography

References

External links 
 
 
 

1983 births
Living people
South Korean male television actors
South Korean male musical theatre actors
South Korean male film actors
People from Seoul